John M. Garlington (June 5, 1946 – February 10, 2000) was an American football linebacker who played in the National Football League (NFL). He played professionally for the Cleveland Browns.

Early life
Garlington was born in Jonesboro, Louisiana and graduated from Jonesboro-Hodge High School in Jonesboro. in 1964. He was a star college athlete at Louisiana State University. At LSU, he was a 1967 Kodak/American Football Coaches Association All-American pick.  He was also a First-team All-SEC pick in 1966 by the Associated Press and in 1967 by both the AP and United Press International.  He was described as an "Incredible athlete whose talents typified his play and teamwork. Had excellent speed and lateral pursuit. Opponents were timid when it came to attacking his side of the defensive line. Even with his size, he was a speed merchant. In the 1966 Rice encounter, John picked off an errant pass and returned it 42 yards for a touchdown."

Professional career
Garlington was drafted by the Cleveland Browns in the 2nd round (47th overall) of the 1968 NFL Draft. He played ten seasons with the Cleveland Browns, from 1968 until 1977.

Law enforcement career
After leaving professional football, Garlington worked, from 1986, as a Wildlife Enforcement Agent (game warden) with the Louisiana Department of Wildlife & Fisheries - Enforcement Division. He was promoted to the rank of Captain, in 1998, and was the commander of the department's Region 1 office near Shreveport, Louisiana. Prior to assuming command of Region 1, Garlington held the rank of Sergeant, and was assigned to the department's Statewide Strike Force. Garlington died in the line of duty, from drowning, while investigating a poaching complaint near his home on the Mill Creek Reservoir near Saline, LA in Bienville Parish. He had been on the force for 14 years. Garlington was survived by his wife Karon Garlington, and son Seth Garlington.

He is buried at the Ebenezer Cemetery off Louisiana Highway 508 in Bienville Parish. His son, Jonesboro police officer John Moses Garlington, was interred at this same cemetery in the spring of 1994.

References

External links
Cleveland Browns Jersey Numbers
Pro-Football-Reference.Com
databaseFootball.com

1946 births
2000 deaths
American football linebackers
American police officers killed in the line of duty
Cleveland Browns players
Jonesboro-Hodge High School alumni
LSU Tigers football players
People from Jonesboro, Louisiana